The 2011–12 Michigan State Spartans men's basketball team represented Michigan State University in the 2011–12 NCAA Division I men's basketball season. The Spartans' head coach was Tom Izzo, who was in his 17th year at Michigan State. The team played its home games at the Breslin Center in East Lansing, Michigan, and were members of the Big Ten Conference. MSU finished with a record of 29–8, 13–5 in Big Ten play to finish in a three-way tie for first place. The Spartans also won the Big Ten tournament. The Spartans received a No. 1 seed in the NCAA tournament, their 15th consecutive trip to the Tournament, and reached the Sweet Sixteen, losing to Louisville.

Previous season 
The Spartans finished the 2010–11 season with an overall record of 19–15, 9–9 in Big Ten play to finish in fourth place. Michigan State received a No. 10 seed in the NCAA tournament, their 14th straight trip to the Tournament, and were eliminated in the Second Round.

Offseason 
The Spartans lost Durrell Summers (11.6 points and 4.2 rebounds per game) and Kalin Lucas (17.0 points and 3.4 assists per game) to graduation following the season.

2011 recruiting class

Season summary
Senior Draymond Green (16.2 points, 10.6 rebounds, and 3.8 assists per game) was the unquestioned leader for the Spartans. MSU started the season unranked and suffered a loss to No. 1 North Carolina in the Carrier Classic which was played on the aircraft carrier USS Carl Vinson in San Diego in the first game of the season. The teams wore special camouflage uniforms for the event. MSU followed that loss with a loss to No. 6 Duke in the Champions Classic. Starting the season 0–2, the Spartans refused to fold. MSU won the next 15 games in a row to jump into the top ten in the polls. The wins in the streak included a win at No. 23 Gonzaga. The Spartans finished the non-conference schedule at 11–2 and ranked No. 16 in the country.

The winning streak continued in Big Ten play with wins over No. 13 Indiana, and at No. 11 Wisconsin. MSU also beat No. 23 Michigan, No. 3 Ohio State, and No. 15 Wisconsin at Breslin Center. A loss in the regular season finale at home to No. 10 Ohio State meant the Spartans would share the Big Ten regular season championship with Ohio State and Michigan, all of which finished the Big Ten season with a 13–5 conference record. In that loss to Ohio State, key freshman reserve, Branden Dawson, tore his ACL, ending his season. The Spartans finished the season ranked No. 8 in the country. The Spartans, due to tiebreak rules, were the No. 1 seed in the Big Ten tournament and beat Iowa, No. 14 Wisconsin, and No. 7 Ohio State to win the Tournament championship. Draymond Green earned Big Ten Player of the Year honors, the fifth time a player had done so under Tom Izzo. Izzo was also named Big Ten Coach of the Year.

MSU received a No. 1 seed in the West Region of the NCAA Tournament, where they beat LIU–Brooklyn in the First Round behind Green's triple-double. The Spartans overcame Saint Louis in the Second Round to advance to the Sweet Sixteen. This marked the 10th time in 15 seasons that the Spartans advanced to at least the Sweet Sixteen. The Spartans, missing Dawson and struggling offensively, became the first No. 1 seed to lose in the Tournament, falling to No. 17 and fourth-seeded Louisville, 57–44.

Roster

Schedule and results

|-
!colspan=9 style=| Exhibition

|-
!colspan=9 style=| Non-conference regular season

|-
!colspan=9 style=|Big Ten regular season

|-
!colspan=9 style=|Big Ten tournament

|- 
!colspan=9 style=|NCAA tournament

|-

Player statistics 

Source

Rankings

*AP does not release post-NCAA tournament rankings

Source

Awards and honors

Draymond Green 
 Big Ten Player of the Year
 AP All-American (unanimous)
 Sporting News All-American First Team
 USBWA All-American
 NABC All-American First Team
 NABC Player of the Year
 USBWA District V Player of the Year
 Big Ten All Defensive Team
 NABC All-District First Team

Tom Izzo 
 Big Ten Coach of the Year
 USBWA District V Coach of the Year
 NABC Division I Coach of the Year

Branden Dawson 
 All Big Ten Honorable Mention (Media)
 Big Ten All-Freshman Team

Keith Appling 
 All Big Ten Third Team

References

Michigan State Spartans men's basketball seasons
Michigan State
Michigan State
2011 in sports in Michigan
2012 in sports in Michigan
Big Ten men's basketball tournament championship seasons